Christine Armstrong is a Canadian film editor. She is most noted for her work on the 2020 film Sugar Daddy, for which she received a Canadian Screen Award nomination for Best Editing at the 9th Canadian Screen Awards in 2021.

Her other credits have included the films Mary Goes Round and The New Romantic.

References

External links

Canadian film editors
Canadian women film editors
Canadian Film Centre alumni
Black Canadian women
Living people
Year of birth missing (living people)